Cheshmeh Rugheni (also Romanized as Cheshmeh Rūghenī, Chashmeh Rowghanī, Chashmeh Rugheni, Cheshmeh Roghanī, Cheshmeh Rowghanī, and Cheshmeh-ye Rowghanī; also known as Bunneh Chashmeh Rughāni) is a village in Rud Zard Rural District, in the Central District of Bagh-e Malek County, Khuzestan Province, Iran. At the 2006 census, its population was 70, in 15 families.

References 

Populated places in Bagh-e Malek County